Supervillain Outcast is the fourth full-length album by Norwegian black metal band Dødheimsgard, now under the moniker DHG. It was released on March 26, 2007, by Moonfog Productions. It was their only release to feature Kvohst on vocals, who replaced Aldrahn after he left the band in 2004.

With this album, the band continues the avant-garde/black metal fusion sound they undertook on their previous album, 666 International; however, the industrial-esque style that was preponderant on 666 International is toned down in order to focus more on the electronic interludes, in a style closer to DHG's EP Satanic Art (1998).

Carl-Michael Eide recorded the drums for the album prior to an accident that left his legs paralyzed.

A double-disc deluxe edition of Supervillain Outcast was released by Peaceville Records in 2012. The extra disc contained seven previously unreleased instrumental tracks; "Senseoffender" is an outtake from the album, and the following six tracks are from a 2003 rehearsal.

Aldrahn briefly returns on this album, providing additional vocals for the tracks "Foe vs. Foe" and "Ghostforce Soul Constrictor".

Track listing

Personnel

DHG
 Kvohst (Mathew McNerney) – Vocals
 Clandestine (Christian Eidskrem) – Bass
 Thrawn Hellspawn (Tom Kvålsvoll) – Guitars, Additional Vocals (7, 8, 13)
 Vicotnik (Yusaf Parvez) – Guitars, Samples, Programming, Additional Vocals (4, 8, 13)

Additional personnel
 Bliss – Programming
 Czral (Carl-Michael Eide) – Drums, Percussion
 Mort – Samples, Programming
 Amok (Amoque Von Berlevaag) – Backing Vocals (13)
 Aort (Andy McIvor) – Performer (1)
 Aldrahn (Bjørn Dencker Gjerde) – Additional Vocals (5, 11)
 Henning Bortne – Production
 Kim Sølve – Artwork, Design
 Trine Paulsen – Artwork

References

2007 albums
Dødheimsgard albums